Juan Carlos Enriquez Ávalos (born 18 September 1990 in Zacatecas, Zacatecas, Mexico) is a Mexican footballer. He currently plays for Tuzos UAZ of Mexico.

Club career
Today he is one of the young promises of Queretaro but has played only a few minutes with the first team. He made his senior team debut on March 19, 2011, as a substitute in a match against Monarcas Morelia in a 0 - 1 loss of Santos.

He scored his first goal against Chiapas on a 3 - 2 loss.

He  played as a forward for Ballenas Galeana of Mexico.

References

External links
 
 
 
 

1990 births
Living people
Association football forwards
Santos Laguna footballers
Querétaro F.C. footballers
Ballenas Galeana Morelos footballers
Universidad Autónoma de Zacatecas FC footballers
C.D. FAS footballers
Mineros de Zacatecas players
Loros UdeC footballers
Liga MX players
Ascenso MX players
Liga Premier de México players
Mexican expatriate footballers
Mexican expatriate sportspeople in El Salvador
Expatriate footballers in El Salvador
Footballers from Zacatecas
People from Zacatecas City
Mexican footballers